Francis Rexford Cooley (born October 16, 1963) is an American politician currently serving as a member of the Connecticut House of Representatives from the 22nd district, which encompasses Plainville as well as parts of Farmington and Southington, since 2023.

Early life and education 
Cooley was born October 16, 1963 in Hartford, Connecticut. He studied History at the University of Colorado (BA) and the University of Maine (MA). Cooley also completed a Master of Education (M. Ed.) at the University of Hartford in 2004.

Career 
Cooley worked as an educator at the Paier College of Art.

Politics 
A member of the Republican Party, Cooley was first elected in 2022 after narrowly defeating Democrat Rebecca Martinez by 53 votes.

References

Living people
Members of the Connecticut House of Representatives
Connecticut Republicans
21st-century American politicians
People from Plainville, Connecticut
People from Hartford, Connecticut
Year of birth missing (living people)